Florence Jaugey (born 22 June 1959) is a French movie director, actress, producer, and screenwriter who lives in Nicaragua. In 1989 Jaugey co-founded with her partner and Nicaraguan filmmaker Frank Pineda, Camila Films (Nicaragua), an independent film production company based in Managua. In 1998, her film Cinema Alcázar, won the Silver Bear award at the Berlin International Film Festival Berlinale.

Biography
Florence Jaugey was born in Nice, France in 1959 and studied drama in Paris at the ENSATT (École Nationale Supérieure des Arts et Techniques du Théâtre). She worked as an actress during the 1980s. In 1984 she traveled to Nicaragua to be the lead actress in the movie El Señor Presidente directed by the Cuban director Manuel Octavio Gómez.

Camila Films
In 1989, together with Frank Pineda a Nicaraguan filmmaker and her partner, they set up in Managua, Camila Films Production Company, an independent film company, directing and producing several short and documentary films, and one feature film La Yuma (2010). A second feature film titled Naked Screen (2014), original title in Spanish La Pantalla Desnuda.

Jaugey's filmmaking has focused on the poverty-stricken people of Nicaragua, such as her short film Cinema Alcázar, winner of the Silver Bear at Berlinale (1998) the first one for Nicaragua. This documentary is about the people that live in the ruins of an earthquake destroyed movie house from the 1950s located in the center of Managua. The documentary The Island of the Lost Children (2001), original title in Spanish La Isla de los Niños Perdidos, filmed in jail and winner of the Society of Authors Award at the International Documentary Festival Cinéma du Réel in Paris in 2002.

One of her last works, a documentary  titled Deceit (2012), original title in Spanish El engaño, portrays the lives of seven women who survived human trafficking and how they struggle to cope with their experiences leading some of them to work for at-risk centers for girls. In the documentary Jaugey travels through Central America exposing the conditions of violence against women.

In 2009 Jaugey directed a drama, her first feature film, titled La Yuma. The film was selected as the Nicaraguan entry for the Best Foreign Language Film at the 83rd Academy Awards but the film didn't make it to the final list. This movie was the first full-length feature film in 20 years from Nicaragua as reported by the World Bank in a paper titled The Projection of Development by Lewis, Rodgers, and Woolcock. Her second feature film, La Pantalla Desnuda (The Naked Screen) is expected to be released in 2014.

Recognition
In 2010 Florence Jaugey received the Order Rubén Darío for Cultural Independence.

Filmography

References

External links
 TEDx Managua video - speaker Florence Jaugey talks about the reality of making movies (Spanish).
 Film Annex - video interview with Florence Jaugey (English) 2010.
 Florence Jaugey YouTube Channel.
 Univision - video interview with Florence Jaugey in 2010 - "Florence Jaugey y la Yuma" (Spanish).
VIMEO - video interview with Florence Jaugey (French).
 La Prensa, Revista (Nicaragua) 2010-10-05. "La Yuma se postula a Oscar" (Spanish).
 Berlinale Talent Campus Newsletter.

1959 births
Living people
French film actresses
French film directors
French women screenwriters
French screenwriters
Nicaraguan film actresses
Nicaraguan women writers
21st-century French actresses
20th-century French actresses
French expatriates in Nicaragua
People from Nice
Nicaraguan directors